The Sultan Ismail Jamek Mosque is the largest mosque in Batu Pahat town in Johor, Malaysia.

History
The mosque was opened in 1996.

See also
 Islam in Malaysia

References

1996 establishments in Malaysia
Batu Pahat District
Mosques in Johor
Mosques completed in 1996
Mosque buildings with domes